Anime Frontier is an annual three-day anime convention held during December at the Fort Worth Convention Center in Fort Worth, Texas.

Programming
The convention typically offers an art show, concert, and cosplay competition.

History
Anime Frontier was announced in June 2019 by LeftField Media. Anime Frontier 2020 was cancelled due to the COVID-19 pandemic. The May 2021 event was postponed to December due to the continuing COVID-19 pandemic. Crunchyroll was the primary sponsor of the 2021 event. Anime Frontier's December event had COVID-19 protocols including proof of vaccination and mask requirements. The convention continued to have COVID-19 protocols in 2022.

Event history

See also
 Anime NYC, also organized by LeftField Media

References

External links
 Anime Frontier Website

Anime conventions in the United States
Recurring events established in 2021
2021 establishments in Texas
Annual events in Texas
Conventions in Texas
Festivals in Texas
Japanese-American culture in Texas
Culture of Fort Worth, Texas
Tourist attractions in Fort Worth, Texas